Ted Collins (born January 2, 1943) was a Canadian football player who played for the Winnipeg Blue Bombers, Montreal Alouettes and Ottawa Rough Riders. He won the Grey Cup with Montreal in 1970. He played college football at the University of Detroit Mercy. His brother Doug Collins also played in the CFL.

References

1946 births
Living people
Montreal Alouettes players
Ottawa Rough Riders players
Winnipeg Blue Bombers players
Detroit Titans football players
Sportspeople from Windsor, Ontario
Players of Canadian football from Ontario
Canadian football defensive linemen
Canadian players of American football